The 1955 Pittsburgh Pirates season was the 74th season of the Pittsburgh Pirates franchise; the 69th in the National League. The Pirates finished eighth and last in the league standings with a record of 60–94.

Offseason 
 Prior to 1955 season: Ellis Burton was signed as an amateur free agent by the Pirates.

Regular season

Season standings

Record vs. opponents

Game log

|- bgcolor="ffbbbb"
| 1 || April 13 || @ Dodgers || 1–6 || Erskine || Surkont (0–1) || — || 6,999 || 0–1
|- bgcolor="ffbbbb"
| 2 || April 14 || Phillies || 3–4 || Wehmeier || Littlefield (0–1) || — || 23,540 || 0–2
|- bgcolor="ffbbbb"
| 3 || April 16 || Dodgers || 0–6 || Meyer || Purkey (0–1) || — || 5,533 || 0–3
|- bgcolor="ffbbbb"
| 4 || April 17 || Dodgers || 3–10 || Podres || Thies (0–1) || — ||  || 0–4
|- bgcolor="ffbbbb"
| 5 || April 17 || Dodgers || 2–3 || Labine || Kline (0–1) || Hughes || 20,499 || 0–5
|- bgcolor="ffbbbb"
| 6 || April 18 || @ Giants || 3–12 || Liddle || Surkont (0–2) || Grissom || 2,915 || 0–6
|- bgcolor="ffbbbb"
| 7 || April 22 || @ Phillies || 4–5 || Miller || Bowman (0–1) || — || 5,821 || 0–7
|- bgcolor="ffbbbb"
| 8 || April 23 || @ Phillies || 0–8 || Dickson || Kline (0–2) || — || 4,132 || 0–8
|- bgcolor="ccffcc"
| 9 || April 24 || @ Phillies || 6–1 || Surkont (1–2) || Owens || — ||  || 1–8
|- bgcolor="ffbbbb"
| 10 || April 24 || @ Phillies || 0–3 || Meyer || King (0–1) || Roberts || 8,224 || 1–9
|- bgcolor="ccffcc"
| 11 || April 27 || Cubs || 4–1 || Purkey (1–1) || Minner || — || 1,044 || 2–9
|- bgcolor="ffbbbb"
| 12 || April 28 || Redlegs || 2–3 || Staley || Littlefield (0–2) || Lane || 6,907 || 2–10
|- bgcolor="ffbbbb"
| 13 || April 29 || Redlegs || 0–5 || Nuxhall || Surkont (1–3) || — || 6,341 || 2–11
|- bgcolor="ccffcc"
| 14 || April 30 || Redlegs || 5–4 || Friend (1–0) || Lane || — || 3,118 || 3–11
|-

|- bgcolor="ffbbbb"
| 15 || May 1 || Cardinals || 3–4 || Tiefenauer || Bowman (0–2) || Moford ||  || 3–12
|- bgcolor="ccffcc"
| 16 || May 1 || Cardinals || 7–0 || Kline (1–2) || Jones || — || 13,213 || 4–12
|- bgcolor="ccffcc"
| 17 || May 2 || Cardinals || 5–1 || Purkey (2–1) || Haddix || — || 2,181 || 5–12
|- bgcolor="ccffcc"
| 18 || May 3 || Braves || 4–0 || Littlefield (1–2) || Spahn || — || 10,784 || 6–12
|- bgcolor="ccffcc"
| 19 || May 4 || Braves || 5–4 || Surkont (2–3) || Jolly || Friend (1) || 13,374 || 7–12
|- bgcolor="ccffcc"
| 20 || May 5 || Braves || 9–4 || King (1–1) || Buhl || Law (1) || 4,329 || 8–12
|- bgcolor="ccffcc"
| 21 || May 6 || @ Giants || 3–2 || Kline (2–2) || Antonelli || Wade (1) || 10,330 || 9–12
|- bgcolor="ffbbbb"
| 22 || May 7 || @ Giants || 3–11 || Hearn || Purkey (2–2) || — || 8,926 || 9–13
|- bgcolor="ccffcc"
| 23 || May 8 || @ Giants || 7–5 || Littlefield (2–2) || Gomez || Face (1) ||  || 10–13
|- bgcolor="ffbbbb"
| 24 || May 8 || @ Giants || 3–6 || Maglie || Law (0–1) || — || 14,180 || 10–14
|- bgcolor="ccffcc"
| 25 || May 10 || @ Braves || 9–6 || Surkont (3–3) || Johnson || — || 20,562 || 11–14
|- bgcolor="ffbbbb"
| 26 || May 11 || @ Braves || 3–8 || Nichols || Kline (2–3) || — || 12,444 || 11–15
|- bgcolor="ffbbbb"
| 27 || May 12 || @ Cubs || 0–4 || Jones || King (1–2) || — || 2,918 || 11–16
|- bgcolor="ffbbbb"
| 28 || May 14 || @ Cardinals || 0–6 || Lawrence || Littlefield (2–3) || — || 9,479 || 11–17
|- bgcolor="ffbbbb"
| 29 || May 15 || @ Cardinals || 1–5 || Jones || Surkont (3–4) || Schultz || 10,996 || 11–18
|- bgcolor="ffbbbb"
| 30 || May 16 || @ Cardinals || 0–6 || Arroyo || Kline (2–4) || — || 5,184 || 11–19
|- bgcolor="ffbbbb"
| 31 || May 17 || @ Redlegs || 2–9 || Nuxhall || Purkey (2–3) || — || 4,881 || 11–20
|- bgcolor="ffbbbb"
| 32 || May 18 || @ Redlegs || 1–5 || Minarcin || Littlefield (2–4) || — || 2,079 || 11–21
|- bgcolor="ffbbbb"
| 33 || May 20 || Giants || 3–6 || Wilhelm || Surkont (3–5) || Grissom || 15,722 || 11–22
|- bgcolor="ffbbbb"
| 34 || May 21 || Giants || 2–3 || Maglie || Kline (2–5) || Grissom || 5,731 || 11–23
|- bgcolor="ffbbbb"
| 35 || May 22 || Giants || 2–5 || Gomez || Bowman (0–3) || — ||  || 11–24
|- bgcolor="ffbbbb"
| 36 || May 22 || Giants || 3–5 (8) || Wilhelm || Wade (0–1) || Grissom || 16,691 || 11–25
|- bgcolor="ccffcc"
| 37 || May 24 || Dodgers || 15–1 || Friend (2–0) || Podres || — || 9,251 || 12–25
|- bgcolor="ffbbbb"
| 38 || May 26 || Dodgers || 2–6 || Newcombe || Kline (2–6) || — || 2,680 || 12–26
|- bgcolor="ffbbbb"
| 39 || May 27 || Phillies || 2–5 (10) || Wehmeier || Friend (2–1) || — || 6,956 || 12–27
|- bgcolor="ffbbbb"
| 40 || May 28 || Phillies || 4–8 (11) || Miller || Face (0–1) || Meyer || 3,082 || 12–28
|- bgcolor="ffbbbb"
| 41 || May 29 || Phillies || 2–5 || Roberts || Pepper (0–1) || — ||  || 12–29
|- bgcolor="ccffcc"
| 42 || May 29 || Phillies || 11–5 || Surkont (4–5) || Cole || — || 5,918 || 13–29
|- bgcolor="ffbbbb"
| 43 || May 30 || @ Dodgers || 4–8 || Meyer || Purkey (2–4) || Roebuck ||  || 13–30
|- bgcolor="ffbbbb"
| 44 || May 30 || @ Dodgers || 3–8 || Newcombe || Kline (2–7) || — || 26,711 || 13–31
|- bgcolor="ccffcc"
| 45 || May 31 || @ Dodgers || 6–3 || Friend (3–1) || Roebuck || — || 6,008 || 14–31
|-

|- bgcolor="ffbbbb"
| 46 || June 1 || Cardinals || 2–6 || Arroyo || Purkey (2–5) || — || 7,580 || 14–32
|- bgcolor="ccffcc"
| 47 || June 2 || Cardinals || 12–3 || Surkont (5–5) || Haddix || — || 2,052 || 15–32
|- bgcolor="ccffcc"
| 48 || June 3 || Redlegs || 7–6 || Law (1–1) || Ridzik || — ||  || 16–32
|- bgcolor="ffbbbb"
| 49 || June 4 || Redlegs || 0–6 || Minarcin || Kline (2–8) || — || 4,072 || 16–33
|- bgcolor="ccffcc"
| 50 || June 5 || Redlegs || 7–6 || Surkont (6–5) || Klippstein || — ||  || 17–33
|- bgcolor="ffbbbb"
| 51 || June 5 || Redlegs || 1–5 || Collum || Purkey (2–6) || — || 10,308 || 17–34
|- bgcolor="ffbbbb"
| 52 || June 7 || Cubs || 3–4 || Hacker || King (1–3) || Pollet || 65,681 || 17–35
|- bgcolor="ccffcc"
| 53 || June 8 || Cubs || 2–1 || Kline (3–8) || Davis || — || 3,779 || 18–35
|- bgcolor="ffbbbb"
| 54 || June 9 || Cubs || 2–6 || Minner || Purkey (2–7) || — || 2,187 || 18–36
|- bgcolor="ffbbbb"
| 55 || June 11 || Braves || 4–7 || Conley || Friend (3–2) || — || 1,995 || 18–37
|- bgcolor="ccffcc"
| 56 || June 12 || Braves || 5–3 || Law (2–1) || Spahn || Face (2) ||  || 19–37
|- bgcolor="ffbbbb"
| 57 || June 12 || Braves || 5–6 || Buhl || Surkont (6–6) || — || 12,738 || 19–38
|- bgcolor="ccffcc"
| 58 || June 14 || @ Cardinals || 10–5 || Kline (4–8) || Jackson || — || 7,962 || 20–38
|- bgcolor="ffbbbb"
| 59 || June 15 || @ Cardinals || 3–7 || Arroyo || Friend (3–3) || — || 6,524 || 20–39
|- bgcolor="ffbbbb"
| 60 || June 16 || @ Cardinals || 0–5 || Haddix || Law (2–2) || — || 6,277 || 20–40
|- bgcolor="ccffcc"
| 61 || June 17 || @ Redlegs || 3–1 || Surkont (7–6) || Collum || Kline (1) || 6,872 || 21–40
|- bgcolor="ffbbbb"
| 62 || June 18 || @ Redlegs || 1–4 || Staley || Donoso (0–1) || — || 3,433 || 21–41
|- bgcolor="ccffcc"
| 63 || June 19 || @ Redlegs || 5–2 || Friend (4–3) || Minarcin || — ||  || 22–41
|- bgcolor="ffbbbb"
| 64 || June 19 || @ Redlegs || 0–4 || Nuxhall || Kline (4–9) || — || 11,640 || 22–42
|- bgcolor="ffbbbb"
| 65 || June 20 || @ Braves || 1–2 || Conley || Law (2–3) || — || 21,510 || 22–43
|- bgcolor="ffbbbb"
| 66 || June 21 || @ Braves || 4–6 || Buhl || Kline (4–10) || — || 25,510 || 22–44
|- bgcolor="ffbbbb"
| 67 || June 22 || @ Braves || 0–6 || Spahn || Surkont (7–7) || — || 23,219 || 22–45
|- bgcolor="ffbbbb"
| 68 || June 24 || @ Cubs || 3–10 || Minner || Friend (4–4) || — || 4,424 || 22–46
|- bgcolor="ffbbbb"
| 69 || June 25 || @ Cubs || 4–6 || Hacker || Littlefield (2–5) || — || 12,181 || 22–47
|- bgcolor="ccffcc"
| 70 || June 26 || @ Cubs || 5–4 || Law (3–3) || Davis || Surkont (1) ||  || 23–47
|- bgcolor="ffbbbb"
| 71 || June 26 || @ Cubs || 1–2 || Rush || Donoso (0–2) || — || 24,500 || 23–48
|- bgcolor="ccffcc"
| 72 || June 28 || @ Phillies || 7–5 (10) || Friend (5–4) || Meyer || Face (3) || 8,635 || 24–48
|- bgcolor="ffbbbb"
| 73 || June 29 || @ Phillies || 3–6 || Negray || Littlefield (2–6) || — || 4,919 || 24–49
|-

|- bgcolor="ccffcc"
| 74 || July 1 || @ Dodgers || 3–2 || Law (4–3) || Podres || — || 10,325 || 25–49
|- bgcolor="ccffcc"
| 75 || July 2 || @ Dodgers || 7–6 (10) || Kline (5–10) || Labine || — || 6,158 || 26–49
|- bgcolor="ccffcc"
| 76 || July 3 || @ Dodgers || 7–5 || Kline (6–10) || Roebuck || — ||  || 27–49
|- bgcolor="ffbbbb"
| 77 || July 3 || @ Dodgers || 1–3 || Loes || Surkont (7–8) || Labine || 15,000 || 27–50
|- bgcolor="ccffcc"
| 78 || July 4 || Giants || 4–3 || Donoso (1–2) || McCall || — ||  || 28–50
|- bgcolor="ffbbbb"
| 79 || July 4 || Giants || 3–5 (11) || Grissom || Donoso (1–3) || — || 16,902 || 28–51
|- bgcolor="ffbbbb"
| 80 || July 5 || Giants || 1–11 || Antonelli || Martin (0–1) || — || 7,245 || 28–52
|- bgcolor="ffbbbb"
| 81 || July 6 || Dodgers || 5–10 || Erskine || Face (0–2) || Roebuck ||  || 28–53
|- bgcolor="ccffcc"
| 82 || July 6 || Dodgers || 4–1 || Law (5–3) || Roebuck || — || 20,674 || 29–53
|- bgcolor="ffbbbb"
| 83 || July 7 || Dodgers || 3–4 || Loes || Kline (6–11) || — || 4,533 || 29–54
|- bgcolor="ffbbbb"
| 84 || July 8 || Phillies || 1–5 || Wehmeier || Surkont (7–9) || — || 7,304 || 29–55
|- bgcolor="ffbbbb"
| 85 || July 9 || Phillies || 1–7 || Roberts || Littlefield (2–7) || — || 2,637 || 29–56
|- bgcolor="ffbbbb"
| 86 || July 10 || Phillies || 1–4 || Simmons || Friend (5–5) || — ||  || 29–57
|- bgcolor="ccffcc"
| 87 || July 10 || Phillies || 3–1 || Law (6–3) || Negray || — || 6,454 || 30–57
|- bgcolor="ffbbbb"
| 88 || July 14 || Redlegs || 1–19 || Collum || Surkont (7–10) || — || 6,947 || 30–58
|- bgcolor="ffbbbb"
| 89 || July 15 || Redlegs || 1–9 || Nuxhall || Law (6–4) || Freeman || 1,563 || 30–59
|- bgcolor="ccffcc"
| 90 || July 16 || Cardinals || 5–1 || Donoso (2–3) || Arroyo || — || 2,579 || 31–59
|- bgcolor="ffbbbb"
| 91 || July 17 || Cardinals || 8–9 (12) || Arroyo || Donoso (2–4) || Lawrence ||  || 31–60
|- bgcolor="ffbbbb"
| 92 || July 17 || Cardinals || 0–1 || Haddix || Face (0–3) || — || 8,490 || 31–61
|- bgcolor="ccffcc"
| 93 || July 19 || Braves || 4–3 (19) || Friend (6–5) || Conley || — || 7,953 || 32–61
|- bgcolor="ccffcc"
| 94 || July 20 || Braves || 4–3 || Littlefield (3–7) || Crone || — || 5,568 || 33–61
|- bgcolor="ffbbbb"
| 95 || July 21 || Braves || 3–5 || Spahn || Donoso (2–5) || — || 2,568 || 33–62
|- bgcolor="ccffcc"
| 96 || July 22 || Cubs || 3–1 || Face (1–3) || Minner || — || 7,388 || 34–62
|- bgcolor="ccffcc"
| 97 || July 23 || Cubs || 10–2 || Friend (7–5) || Hacker || — || 2,955 || 35–62
|- bgcolor="ccffcc"
| 98 || July 24 || Cubs || 12–5 || Hall (1–0) || Rush || — ||  || 36–62
|- bgcolor="ccffcc"
| 99 || July 24 || Cubs || 3–2 (10) || Law (7–4) || Jones || — || 14,466 || 37–62
|- bgcolor="ccffcc"
| 100 || July 26 || @ Cardinals || 3–1 || Littlefield (4–7) || Arroyo || — || 10,261 || 38–62
|- bgcolor="ffbbbb"
| 101 || July 27 || @ Cardinals || 1–6 || Haddix || Face (1–4) || — || 6,424 || 38–63
|- bgcolor="ffbbbb"
| 102 || July 28 || @ Cardinals || 1–4 || Schmidt || Hall (1–1) || — || 6,039 || 38–64
|- bgcolor="ffbbbb"
| 103 || July 29 || @ Redlegs || 5–16 || Nuxhall || Law (7–5) || — || 5,690 || 38–65
|- bgcolor="ffbbbb"
| 104 || July 30 || @ Redlegs || 2–5 || Collum || Friend (7–6) || — || 3,030 || 38–66
|- bgcolor="ffbbbb"
| 105 || July 31 || @ Redlegs || 4–7 || Black || Littlefield (4–8) || Freeman ||  || 38–67
|- bgcolor="ffbbbb"
| 106 || July 31 || @ Redlegs || 5–6 || Freeman || Donoso (2–6) || — || 9,704 || 38–68
|-

|- bgcolor="ccffcc"
| 107 || August 1 || @ Cubs || 5–4 || Hall (2–1) || Minner || — || 3,194 || 39–68
|- bgcolor="ffbbbb"
| 108 || August 2 || @ Cubs || 4–12 || Rush || Littlefield (4–9) || — || 1,788 || 39–69
|- bgcolor="ccffcc"
| 109 || August 3 || @ Cubs || 3–2 || Face (2–4) || Davis || Surkont (2) ||  || 40–69
|- bgcolor="ffbbbb"
| 110 || August 3 || @ Cubs || 4–5 (12) || Perkowski || Law (7–6) || — || 8,805 || 40–70
|- bgcolor="ffbbbb"
| 111 || August 4 || @ Cubs || 10–11 || Tremel || Littlefield (4–10) || — || 3,486 || 40–71
|- bgcolor="ccffcc"
| 112 || August 5 || @ Braves || 8–5 || Hall (3–1) || Spahn || Donoso (1) || 21,791 || 41–71
|- bgcolor="ccffcc"
| 113 || August 6 || @ Braves || 2–0 || Friend (8–6) || Crone || — || 16,337 || 42–71
|- bgcolor="ffbbbb"
| 114 || August 7 || @ Braves || 3–6 || Nichols || Law (7–7) || Johnson ||  || 42–72
|- bgcolor="ffbbbb"
| 115 || August 7 || @ Braves || 2–4 || Buhl || Face (2–5) || — || 26,955 || 42–73
|- bgcolor="ffbbbb"
| 116 || August 9 || @ Phillies || 1–9 || Wehmeier || Hall (3–2) || — || 9,347 || 42–74
|- bgcolor="ccffcc"
| 117 || August 10 || @ Phillies || 3–2 (10) || Friend (9–6) || Miller || — || 3,922 || 43–74
|- bgcolor="ffbbbb"
| 118 || August 14 || @ Giants || 2–4 || Antonelli || Law (7–8) || — ||  || 43–75
|- bgcolor="ffbbbb"
| 119 || August 14 || @ Giants || 1–3 || Hearn || Hall (3–3) || — || 7,166 || 43–76
|- bgcolor="ffbbbb"
| 120 || August 16 || Phillies || 3–12 || Wehmeier || Friend (9–7) || — || 6,290 || 43–77
|- bgcolor="ccffcc"
| 121 || August 17 || Phillies || 6–4 || Face (3–5) || Simmons || — || 3,721 || 44–77
|- bgcolor="ccffcc"
| 122 || August 19 || Giants || 8–3 || Law (8–8) || Antonelli || — || 9,695 || 45–77
|- bgcolor="ffbbbb"
| 123 || August 20 || Giants || 9–14 (12) || Hearn || Littlefield (4–11) || — || 4,336 || 45–78
|- bgcolor="ccffcc"
| 124 || August 23 || Redlegs || 2–1 || Law (9–8) || Freeman || — || 6,387 || 46–78
|- bgcolor="ccffcc"
| 125 || August 24 || Redlegs || 4–2 || Hall (4–3) || Nuxhall || — || 2,399 || 47–78
|- bgcolor="ccffcc"
| 126 || August 25 || Cubs || 2–1 || Face (4–5) || Minner || — || 6,181 || 48–78
|- bgcolor="ffbbbb"
| 127 || August 26 || Cubs || 3–6 || Jones || Friend (9–8) || — || 5,376 || 48–79
|- bgcolor="ffbbbb"
| 128 || August 27 || Cubs || 3–4 || Pollet || Surkont (7–11) || — || 3,210 || 48–80
|- bgcolor="ccffcc"
| 129 || August 28 || Braves || 5–3 || Hall (5–3) || Crone || Kline (2) ||  || 49–80
|- bgcolor="ccffcc"
| 130 || August 28 || Braves || 2–0 || Law (10–8) || Spahn || — || 12,032 || 50–80
|- bgcolor="ccffcc"
| 131 || August 30 || Cardinals || 3–1 || Littlefield (5–11) || Haddix || Face (4) || 7,526 || 51–80
|- bgcolor="ccffcc"
| 132 || August 31 || Cardinals || 4–3 (10) || Donoso (3–6) || Schmidt || — || 6,379 || 52–80
|-

|- bgcolor="ccffcc"
| 133 || September 1 || Cardinals || 7–6 || Face (5–5) || Wright || — || 2,878 || 53–80
|- bgcolor="ffbbbb"
| 134 || September 2 || @ Dodgers || 0–2 || Spooner || Hall (5–4) || — || 10,827 || 53–81
|- bgcolor="ffbbbb"
| 135 || September 3 || @ Dodgers || 0–4 || Koufax || Friend (9–9) || — || 7,767 || 53–82
|- bgcolor="ffbbbb"
| 136 || September 4 || @ Dodgers || 5–6 || Labine || Surkont (7–12) || Craig || 13,258 || 53–83
|- bgcolor="ccffcc"
| 137 || September 5 || @ Giants || 8–5 (10) || Friend (10–9) || Grissom || Hall (1) ||  || 54–83
|- bgcolor="ffbbbb"
| 138 || September 5 || @ Giants || 3–6 || Liddle || Face (5–6) || — || 10,352 || 54–84
|- bgcolor="ccffcc"
| 139 || September 7 || @ Cubs || 2–0 || Friend (11–9) || Minner || — || 3,076 || 55–84
|- bgcolor="ffbbbb"
| 140 || September 9 || @ Braves || 2–3 || Spahn || Hall (5–5) || — || 15,614 || 55–85
|- bgcolor="ffbbbb"
| 141 || September 10 || @ Braves || 5–13 || Crone || Law (10–9) || — || 11,071 || 55–86
|- bgcolor="ffbbbb"
| 142 || September 11 || @ Cardinals || 5–6 || Jackson || Littlefield (5–12) || — || 7,877 || 55–87
|- bgcolor="ccffcc"
| 143 || September 12 || @ Cardinals || 9–3 || Donoso (4–6) || Haddix || — || 3,289 || 56–87
|- bgcolor="ccffcc"
| 144 || September 13 || @ Redlegs || 5–2 || Friend (12–9) || Nuxhall || — || 3,962 || 57–87
|- bgcolor="ffbbbb"
| 145 || September 16 || @ Phillies || 1–8 || Roberts || Surkont (7–13) || — || 10,023 || 57–88
|- bgcolor="ccffcc"
| 146 || September 18 || @ Phillies || 5–2 || Friend (13–9) || Wehmeier || Face (5) ||  || 58–88
|- bgcolor="ffbbbb"
| 147 || September 18 || @ Phillies || 1–2 || Rogovin || Hall (5–6) || — || 12,683 || 58–89
|- bgcolor="ffbbbb"
| 148 || September 20 || @ Giants || 1–11 || Antonelli || Law (10–10) || — ||  || 58–90
|- bgcolor="ffbbbb"
| 149 || September 20 || @ Giants || 8–14 || Wilhelm || Surkont (7–14) || — || 1,165 || 58–91
|- bgcolor="ffbbbb"
| 150 || September 21 || @ Giants || 2–7 || Liddle || Face (5–7) || — ||  || 58–92
|- bgcolor="ffbbbb"
| 151 || September 21 || @ Giants || 3–7 || Monzant || Kline (6–12) || — || 2,091 || 58–93
|- bgcolor="ccffcc"
| 152 || September 24 || Dodgers || 4–3 || Hall (6–6) || Bessent || — ||  || 59–93
|- bgcolor="ccffcc"
| 153 || September 24 || Dodgers || 6–1 || Friend (14–9) || Koufax || — || 4,531 || 60–93
|- bgcolor="ffbbbb"
| 154 || September 25 || Dodgers || 0–4 || Meyer || Kline (6–13) || Craig || 25,185 || 60–94
|-

|-
| Legend:       = Win       = LossBold = Pirates team member

Opening Day lineup

Notable transactions 
 August 27, 1955: Red Swanson was signed as an amateur free agent (bonus baby) by the Pirates.

Roster

Player stats

Batting

Starters by position 
Note: Pos = Position; G = Games played; AB = At bats; H = Hits; Avg. = Batting average; HR = Home runs; RBI = Runs batted in

Other batters 
Note: G = Games played; AB = At bats; H = Hits; Avg. = Batting average; HR = Home runs; RBI = Runs batted in

Pitching

Starting pitchers 
Note: G = Games pitched; IP = Innings pitched; W = Wins; L = Losses; ERA = Earned run average; SO = Strikeouts

Other pitchers 
Note: G = Games pitched; IP = Innings pitched; W = Wins; L = Losses; ERA = Earned run average; SO = Strikeouts

Relief pitchers 
Note: G = Games pitched; W = Wins; L = Losses; SV = Saves; ERA = Earned run average; SO = Strikeouts

Awards and honors 

All-Star Game
Frank Thomas, reserve

Farm system

LEAGUE CO-CHAMPIONS: Brunswick

Notes

References 
 1955 Pittsburgh Pirates at Baseball Reference
 1955 Pittsburgh Pirates at Baseball Almanac

Pittsburgh Pirates seasons
Pittsburgh Pirates season
Pittsburg Pir